Jackie Keith Whitley (July 1, 1954 – May 9, 1989) was an American country music singer and songwriter. During his career, Whitley released only two albums but charted 12 singles on the Billboard country charts, and 7 more after his death.

Born in Ashland, Kentucky, Whitley grew up in nearby Sandy Hook, Kentucky. Whitley began his career there in 1970, performing in Ralph Stanley's band. Establishing himself as a lead singer in bluegrass music, Whitley moved to Nashville in 1983 and began his recording career there. His first Top 20 Country Hit single, "Miami, My Amy", was released in 1986. In 1988, his first three singles from his studio album Don't Close Your Eyes, the title song, "When You Say Nothing at All" and "I'm No Stranger to the Rain" were number one hits. Years of alcoholism severely compromised his health and he died of alcohol intoxication in 1989 at his Goodlettsville home at the age of 34. His later singles, "I Wonder Do You Think of Me",  "It Ain't Nothin'", and "I'm Over You", were released after his death.

In 2022, he was inducted into the Country Music Hall of Fame.

Early life
Whitley was born to Faye Ferguson (editor of The Elliott County News) and Elmer Whitley (an electrician) in Ashland, Kentucky, but was raised 46 miles away in Sandy Hook, and attended Sandy Hook High School. He had two brothers, Randy and Dwight, and a sister, Mary. The Whitley family is of English and Scots-Irish descent and has lived in the Elliott County area since the 1840s.

While Whitley was a teenager in Sandy Hook, he and his friends would pass the time drinking bootleg bourbon and racing their cars down mountain roads at dangerous speeds. The car wrecked, killing his friend and almost breaking Whitley's neck. In another incident, he drove his car off a  cliff into a frozen river, escaping with only a broken collar bone.

Whitley lost his brother Randy in an October 1983 motorcycle accident, and his father Elmer.

Musical career
Whitley is known for his neotraditional brand of country popularized by hit artists such as George Strait and Randy Travis.

In 1969 he performed in a musical contest in Ezel, Kentucky, with brother Dwight on five-string banjo. Ricky Skaggs was also in the contest.  Skaggs and Whitley hit it off right away and quickly befriended each other.

Sixteen-year-old Whitley and 16-year-old Skaggs were discovered in Ft. Gay, West Virginia, by Ralph Stanley who was 45 minutes late for a show due to a flat tire. Stanley opened the door of the club and heard what he thought was the Stanley Brothers playing on a jukebox. However it was Whitley and Skaggs, who "sounded just like me and Carter in the early days". The two soon joined Ralph's band. Whitley became lead singer for Stanley in 1974.  Whitley also played with J.D. Crowe & the New South in the mid-1970s. During this period, he established himself as one of the most versatile and talented lead singers in bluegrass. His singing was heavily influenced by Carter Stanley and Lefty Frizzell. He moved to Nashville in 1983 to pursue a country music career and soon signed a record deal with RCA Records.

Whitley's first solo album, A Hard Act to Follow, was released in 1984, and featured a more mainstream country style. While Whitley was working hard to achieve his own style, the songs he produced were inconsistent. Critics regarded the album as too erratic. Whitley honed his sound within the next few years for his next album, L.A. to Miami.

L.A. to Miami, released in 1985, would give him his first Top 20 country hit single, "Miami, My Amy". The song was followed by three more hit songs: "Ten Feet Away", "Homecoming '63", and "Hard Livin'", The album also included "On the Other Hand" and "Nobody in His Right Mind Would've Left Her". "On the Other Hand" was pitched to Whitley before Randy Travis released the song as a single and when Whitley's version wasn't released as a single, Travis released his in 1986, as did George Strait with "Nobody in His Right Mind Would've Left Her".

During his tour to promote L.A. to Miami, he met and began a romantic relationship with country singer Lorrie Morgan. They were married in November 1986 and  had their only child, a son, Jesse Keith Whitley in June 1987. Whitley also adopted Lorrie's daughter, Morgan, from her first marriage.

He also asked if he could take a major role in creating the songs and in production. The new album, titled Don't Close Your Eyes, was released in 1988, and the album sold extremely well. The album contained one of the many songs that Whitley had a hand in writing in his years at Tree Publishing, "It's All Coming Back to Me Now". On the album was a remake of Lefty Frizzell's classic standard "I Never Go Around Mirrors," and the song became a huge hit at Whitley's concerts. The first three singles from the album—"When You Say Nothing at All," "I'm No Stranger to the Rain," and the title cut—all reached No. 1 on Billboards country charts during the autumn of 1988 and the winter of 1989, with the title track "Don't Close Your Eyes" being ranked as Billboard’s No. 1 Country song of 1988. Shortly thereafter, "I'm No Stranger to the Rain" also earned Whitley his first and only Country Music Association award as a solo artist and a Grammy nomination for Best Country Vocal Performance, Male.

In early 1989, Whitley approached RCA chairman Joe Galante with the intention of releasing "I Never Go Around Mirrors" as a single. Galante approved of the musical flexibility that Whitley achieved with the song; however, he suggested that Whitley record something new and more upbeat. The result was a song Whitley had optioned for his previous album called I Wonder Do You Think of Me, and was to result in his next album release.

Death
On May 9, 1989, Whitley had a brief phone call with his mother and was later visited by his brother-in-law, Lane Palmer. The two had coffee and were planning a day of golf and lunch, after which Whitley planned to start writing songs for him and Lorrie Morgan to record when she returned from her concert tour. Upon returning, Palmer found Whitley unresponsive on his bed and called an ambulance. Whitley was taken to the hospital where he was pronounced dead, at the age of 34.

The official cause of death was acute ethanolism (alcohol poisoning). Davidson County Medical Examiner Charles Harlan stated that Whitley's blood alcohol level was 0.47 (the equivalent of 20 one-ounce shots of 100-proof whiskey).Edwards, Joe. – "Keith Whitley discovered dead – Alcohol overdose cause of death". – Austin American-Statesman. – May 10, 1989.Hurst, Jack. – "Whitley's Last Days". – Chicago Tribune. – May 14, 1989. He was born in 1954 per his birth certificate and passport, but RCA and his grave marker erroneously recorded his birth year as 1955.Stambler, Irwin, and Grelun Landon (2000). – Country Music: The Encyclopedia. – New York: St. Martin's Press. – p.533. – .—Carlin, Richard (2003). – Country Music: A Biographical Dictionary. – New York: Routledge – p.427. – .—Larkin, Colin (1995). – The Guinness Encyclopedia of Popular Music. – New York: Stockton Press – P.4462. – .—Stanton, Scott (2003). – The Tombstone Tourist: Musicians. – New York: Pocket Books. – p.395. – .—Hicks, Jack. – "Singer Keith Whitley's Memory Alive Through Songs, Love in Home Town". – The Kentucky Post. – September 25, 1991.—"Country Music Star Keith Whitley Dead at 33". – Lexington Herald-Leader. – May 10, 1989.—Hurst, Jack. – "Whitley's Last Days". – Chicago Tribune. – May 14, 1989.—"Alcohol Kills Country Singer Keith Whitley". – United Press International. – (c/o The San Francisco Chronicle). – May 10, 1989.

The day after his death, Music Row was lined with black ribbons in memory of Whitley. He is buried in the Spring Hill Cemetery outside Nashville. His gravestone reads, "Forever yours faithfully" (part one) and "His being was my reason" (part two). The "yours" in part one refers to Whitley, and the "my" in part two refers to Morgan, who has a future burial spot next to him.

Posthumous releases
At the time of his death, Whitley had just finished work on his third and final studio album, I Wonder Do You Think of Me. The album was released three months after his death, on August 1, 1989. The album produced two more No. 1 hits, with the title track and "It Ain't Nothin'." "I'm Over You" also was in the Top 5 in early 1990, reaching No. 3.

Two new songs were added to "Greatest Hits": The first, "Tell Lorrie I Love Her" was written and recorded at home by Whitley for Morgan, originally intended as a work tape for Whitley's friend Curtis 'Mr. Harmony' Young to sing at Whitley's wedding. The second was "'Til a Tear Becomes a Rose", a 1987 demo taken from Tree that originally featured harmony vocals by childhood friend Ricky Skaggs. Lorrie Morgan, with creative control and license to Whitley's namesake, recorded her voice alongside Whitley's, and released it as a single, which rose to No. 13 and won them 1990's CMA award for Best Vocal Collaboration as well as a Grammy nomination for Best Country Vocal Collaboration.

RCA also released a compilation of performance clips (from his days in the Ralph Stanley-Fronted Clinch Mountain Boys), interviews, and some previously unreleased material under the title "Kentucky Bluebird". The album produced hits for Whitley as well, including a duet with Earl Thomas Conley, named "Brotherly Love," which peaked at No. 2 in late 1991 and gave Whitley his second consecutive posthumous Grammy nomination for Best Country Vocal Collaboration.

In 1994, Whitley's widow, Lorrie Morgan, organized several of Whitley's friends in bluegrass and some of the big names in country at the time to record a tribute album to Whitley. The album, Keith Whitley: A Tribute Album, was released in September 1994 via BNA. It included covers of Whitley's songs from artists such as Alan Jackson, Diamond Rio, and Ricky Skaggs. The album also included four previously unreleased tracks recorded by Whitley in 1987, one of which had Morgan dubbed in as a duet partner. The album also included two original songs: "Little Boy Lost", co-written and sung by Daron Norwood, and "A Voice Still Rings True", a multi-artist song. Alison Krauss's rendition of "When You Say Nothing at All" was released as a single from the album, reaching number 3 on the country charts in 1995.

In 1995, the album Wherever You Are Tonight was released, produced by Lorrie Morgan, featuring restored demos of 1986–1988, with crisper 1990s recording techniques and a full orchestra. The album and single of the same name both did very well on the Billboard and R&R charts and "Super Hits" and "The Essential Keith Whitley" followed in 1996. "The Essential" contained the remastered and long since unavailable LP and Whitley's debut, the 6-Track "A Hard Act to Follow", and a scrapped song from 1986's "LA to Miami", "I Wonder Where You Are Tonight".

In 2004, songwriter Jeff Swope began writing a film treatment for a biographical film concerning Whitley's life and death that was shelved in 2006. On April 13, 2010, he announced that pre-production was set to begin again, pending investors.

Several film projects depicting Whitley's life were slated. One idea was a film version of the George Vescey-Lorrie Morgan-penned "Forever Yours, Faithfully". While Morgan's book was a benchmark in piecing together Whitley's final moments, perhaps the most research went into a project titled "Kentucky Bluebird", which was to star writer/actor/director David Keith. This project was in development hell for several years, and was halted in late 2006 also, after difficulties with casting and funding.

Discography

1984: A Hard Act to Follow (EP)
1985: L.A. to Miami
1988: Don't Close Your Eyes
1989: I Wonder Do You Think of Me
1991: Kentucky Bluebird
1995: Wherever You Are Tonight
2000: Sad Songs & Waltzes

Awards and nominations

AwardsCountry Music Association 1989 Single of the Year - "I'm No Stranger to the Rain"
 1990 Vocal Event of the Year - with Lorrie Morgan – "'Til a Tear Becomes a Rose"

NominationsCountry Music Association 1989 Male Vocalist of the Year
 1989 Horizon Award
 1990 Album of the Year – "I Wonder Do You Think of Me"
 1992 Vocal Event of the Year - with Earl Thomas ConleyAcademy of Country Music 1985 Top New Male Vocalist
 1988 Single Record of the Year - "Don't Close Your Eyes"
 1988 Song of the Year - "Don't Close Your Eyes" - written by Bob McDill
 1989 Single Record of the Year - "I'm No Stranger to the Rain"
 1991 Video of the Year - "Brotherly Love" with Earl Thomas ConleyGrammy Awards'''
 1989 Best Male Country Vocal Performance - "I'm No Stranger to the Rain"

References
Erlewine, Stephen Thomas. – [ Keith Whitley: Biography]. – Allmusic.
Skinker, Chris (1998). – "Keith Whitley". – The Encyclopedia of Country Music: The Ultimate Guide to the Music''. – First Edition. – Paul Kingsbury, editor. – New York: Oxford University Press. – pp. 583–584. 

1954 births
1989 deaths
20th-century American guitarists
20th-century American singers
Alcohol-related deaths in Tennessee
American acoustic guitarists
American country guitarists
American country singer-songwriters
Burials in Tennessee
Country musicians from Kentucky
Guitarists from Kentucky
Musicians from Appalachia
Musicians from Ashland, Kentucky
New South (band) members
People from Elliott County, Kentucky
RCA Records Nashville artists
Singer-songwriters from Kentucky